Marko Vasić, known as Kara-Marko was a Serbian Revolutionary

Life and career
Vasić was born into a large zadruga (patriarchal extended family) in the Gručići hamlet in the village of Crvica, in the Osat region. He was a blacksmith by trade. As one of the strongest and bravest in Osat, he was chosen to lead the Serb villagers in the region against Janissary attacks. With the outbreak of the First Serbian Uprising (1804), archimandrite and rebel leader Hadži Melentije Stevanović called on him and his fellows to support the rebels against the Dahije in the first fights on the Drina. He led rebels alongside Hadži Melentije, Mateja Nenadović and Jakov Nenadović.

After his heroic deeds had been heard, supreme commander Karađorđe summoned him and gave him the nickname "Kara-Marko". Karađorđe lent Kara-Marko an army and vojvoda (general) Lazar Mutap to liberate Osat and Srebrenica from the Ottomans. Kara-Marko and Mutap liberated most of Osat until the Ottoman Army attacked and the rebels retreated across the Drina. His wife was killed during the retreat. 

After the Pećani Assembly (17 April 1805), Kara-Marko participated in the liberation of Užice. In 1806 he returned to Podrinje with Hadži-Melentije with whom he led fights against the Turks on the Sikirić ferry on the Drina. With Hadži-Melentije, Milan Obrenović, Mateja Nenadović and Sima Birčanin he led the Serb rebel army against the Turks on Lučindan 1808 in Oklenac, Vranjkovina in Osat, and Pribićevac near Srebrenica. In this skirmish he led the army in an assault from Skelani to Srebrenica and Osmače, then a battle was fought in Pribićevac. Luka Lazarević mentioned him in his memoirs, regarding fights in Osat and Srebrenica in 1809: "Karamarko expels the Turks, and rises the [Orthodox] Christians against them".

After Hadži-Melentije left for the Russian Empire in 1810, Karađorđe appointed Kara-Marko the vojvoda of the Sokol nahija (district) and a military senior (starešina) in Rača. At this time, his clerk was Nićifor Ninković, and his buljubaše (captains) were Petar and Janko. After an intrigue, Karađorđe had him removed on 7 April 1813, after which he was for a short period with Mateja Nenadović in Valjevo. In May 1813 he gathered an army and crossed into Osat to defend it from the Ottomans. He was one of few that did not flee to the Habsburg monarchy after the suppression of the uprising. He settled a village near Topola and became a hajduk (brigand). Due to his loyalty to Karađorđe, the new Serbian leader Miloš Obrenović ordered his murder and had his severed head given to the Vizier of Belgrade. The rest of his body were brought by his descendants to the church in Grabovac near Valjevo to be buried in the porta in 1845.

See also
Luka Milovanov Georgijević (1784–1828)
 List of Serbian Revolutionaries

References
Notes

Sources
 
  
  
 
 

18th-century births
1815 deaths
19th-century Serbian people
Serbs from the Ottoman Empire
Serbian revolutionaries
People of the First Serbian Uprising
Serbs of Bosnia and Herzegovina
Serbian people of Bosnia and Herzegovina descent
People from Srebrenica
Hajduks
Trophy heads
Serbian blacksmiths
Assassinations in the Ottoman Empire
1815 murders in the Ottoman Empire